Groebertherium is a genus of dryolestoid mammal from the Late Cretaceous Los Alamitos and Allen Formations of Argentina. It is not closely related to other contemporary dryolestoids, all of which are part of the clade Meridiolestida.

Classification
Groebertherium has been consistently recovered as a dryolestoid within Dryolestida and outside of Meridiolestida, though its exact positioning varies among several studies. Rougier et al. 2011, for example, recovers it as a member of Dryolestidae, rendering it a relictual survivor of this clade with a gap of 40 million years in relation to the youngest northern dryolestids, while Harper et al. 2018 recovers it as slightly closer to Meridiolestida than to northern dryolestoids.

Palaeobiology 
Unlike meridiolestidans, it retains a parastylar hook on its molariform teeth. Therefore, it was likely less specialised to transverse (side-to-side) mastication. It was rather similar to Dryolestes, indicating a similar tenrec or hedgehog-like lifestyle.

References 

Dryolestida
Cretaceous mammals of South America
Late Cretaceous tetrapods of South America
Late Cretaceous genus first appearances
Late Cretaceous genus extinctions
Santonian life
Campanian life
Maastrichtian life
Cretaceous Argentina
Fossils of Argentina
Allen Formation
Los Alamitos Formation
Fossil taxa described in 1986
Taxa named by José Bonaparte
Prehistoric mammal genera